Bushnellsville Creek flows into Esopus Creek.

References

Geography of New York (state)